Leggeloo is a hamlet in the Dutch province of Drenthe. It is a part of the municipality of Westerveld, and lies about 17 km north of Hoogeveen.

The hamlet was first mentioned in 1217 as in Legghelo. The etymology is unclear. Leggeloo was home to 172 people in 1840.

References

Populated places in Drenthe
Westerveld